Francis Reynolds (died 12 August 1773) was a British politician.  He inherited Strangeways Hall in Manchester from his father Thomas Reynolds.  Francis Reynolds was Member of Parliament for Lancaster from 1745 until his death in 1773.

References

1773 deaths
Year of birth missing